Stouffville Aerodrome  is located  northwest of Stouffville Ontario, Canada.

The private airfield is home to Ultralight aviation aircraft stored in a heated hanger.

References

Registered aerodromes in Ontario
Transport in Whitchurch-Stouffville
Buildings and structures in Whitchurch-Stouffville